The Russia–EU gas dispute flared up in March 2022 following the invasion of Ukraine in late February. Russia and the major EU countries clashed over the issue of payment for pipeline natural gas exported to Europe by Russia's Gazprom. In June, Russia cut the flow of gas by more than half, in July it stopped and resumed it, and in September it stopped it altogether. On 26 September 2022, the Nord Stream 1 and 2 gas pipelines both ruptured with evidence of sabotage.

Background

Europe consumed 512 billion cubic metres (bcm) of natural gas in 2020, of which 185 bcm (36%) came from Russia. In early 2022, Russia supplied 45% of EU's natural gas imports, earning $900 million a day, and by October 2022, it had decreased to 7.5%.

Following Russia's invasion of Ukraine in February 2022, the United States, the European Union, and other countries, introduced or significantly expanded sanctions to cut off "selected Russian banks" from SWIFT.  Assets of the Central Bank of Russia held in Western nations were frozen: the Central Bank of Russia was blocked from accessing more than $400 billion in foreign-exchange reserves held abroad. Accounts in Western banks owned by Gazprom were also frozen. Any money deposited into these frozen Gazprom accounts including payments for natural gas were also frozen.

The Biden administration had initially allowed Russia to continue to repurpose its funds in U.S. financial institutions to make due payments on Russia's sovereign debt. But on 4 April 2022, the U.S. Department of the Treasury banned Russia from withdrawing funds held in U.S. banks to pay off its debt obligations.

Russia, which in early 2022 held $630 billion in foreign-exchange reserves, was consequently unable to make payments on its debt in US dollars or Euros as it was contractually required to do. Two dollar denominated bonds issued by Russian government matured on 4 April 2022. On 5 April, Russia attempted to pay its bond holders with dollars from $600M of reserves held in U.S. banks, but these were blocked by the U.S. government as part of the international sanctions during the Russo-Ukrainian War. In April 2022 Russia defaulted on its foreign debt by failing to pay its obligations in U.S. dollars. The credit agency S&P Global stated that Russia was in "selective default" because it tried to pay obligations on dollar denominated debt in rubles, which could not be converted into "dollars equivalent to the originally due amounts".

In March 2022, the European Commission and International Energy Agency presented joint plans to reduce reliance on Russian energy, reduce Russian gas imports by two thirds within a year, and completely by 2030. In April 2022, European Commission President Ursula von der Leyen said "the era of Russian fossil fuels in Europe will come to an end". On 18 May 2022, the European Union published plans to end its reliance on Russian oil, natural gas and coal by 2027.

Demand of payment in rubles, March 2022

On 23 March 2022, Russian President Vladimir Putin announced payments for Russian pipeline gas would be switched from "the currencies that had been compromised" (US dollar and euro) to payments in roubles vis-à-vis the previously formally designated "unfriendly countries", including all European Union states; on 28 March, he ordered the Central Bank of Russia, the government, and Gazprom to present proposals by 31 March for gas payments in rubles from "unfriendly countries". President Putin's move was construed to be aimed at forcing European companies to directly prop up the Russian currency as well as bringing Russia's Central Bank back into the global financial system after the sanctions had nearly cut it off from financial markets. ING bank's chief economist, Carsten Brzeski, told Deutsche Welle he thought the gas-for-ruble demand was "a smart move". At the end of April 2022, Russian Foreign Minister Sergey Lavrov said that the $300 billion of Gazprom's funds that had in effect been "stolen" by the "Western 'friends'" were actually the funds they had paid for Russia's gas, which meant that all those years they had been consuming the Russian gas free of charge; he thus made a point that the new payment system was designed to preclude "the continuation of the brazen thievery those countries were involved in".

On 28 March, Germany's Economy Minister Robert Habeck announced that the Group of Seven countries had rejected Russian President's demand that payment for gas be made in rubles. On the same day, Russian president's spokesman, Dmitry Peskov, said that Russia would "not supply gas for free".

On 29 March, it was reported that the physical gas flows through the Yamal-Europe pipeline at Germany's Mallnow point had decreased to zero. The following day, Germany's Economy and Climate Minister Robert Habeck triggered the "early warning" level for gas supplies, the first step of a national gas emergency plan that involved setting up a crisis team of representatives from the federal and state governments, regulators and private industry and that could, eventually, lead to gas rationing; he urged Germans to voluntarily cut their energy consumption as a way of ending the country's dependence on Russia. A similar step was undertaken by the Austrian government. Meanwhile, Gazprom said it continued to supply gas to Europe via Ukraine. Russia's gas had also begun flowing westward through the pipeline via Poland. Russia's TASS reported that President Putin had a phone call with Germany's Chancellor Olaf Scholz to "inform him on the decision to switch to payments in rubles for gas". According to Olaf Scholz's office, President Vladimir Putin told the German Chancellor that European companies could continue paying in euros or dollars.

Decree 172
On 31 March, President Vladimir Putin signed a decree −  − that obligated, starting 1 April, purchasers of Russian pipeline gas from countries on Russia's Unfriendly Countries List to make their payments for Russian gas through a facility run by Russia's Gazprombank, a subsidiary of Gazprom. To pay for gas, purchaser companies from "unfriendly countries" would be required to open two accounts at Gazprombank and transfer foreign currency in which they previously made payments into one of them, which Gazprombank would then sell on the Moscow stock exchange for rubles that are deposited into the second (foreign-purchaser owned) ruble-denominated account (this currency conversion would be done in Russia). Gazprombank would then transfer this ruble payment to Gazprom PJSC (a company that operates gas pipeline systems, produces and explores gas, and transports high pressure gas in the Russian Federation and European countries), at which point the purchaser would be deemed to have legally fulfilled (under Russian law) its obligations to pay. Gas purchasers were thus still able to make payments by transferring foreign (non-ruble) currencies, including the currencies stipulated by their contract, which in most cases were US dollars and Euros. Despite this, the obligatory new payment mechanism introduced by decree 172 has been colloquially referred to as a "demand to pay in rubles" by many media outlets. 

The natural gas contracts stipulated the currency in which payments to Gazprom were to be made − 97% of which were in US dollars or euros − as well as the accounts into which the payments were to be deposited, which were Gazprom-owned accounts at Western financial institutions. These accounts had been frozen by Western sanctions and any payments deposited into these accounts would also be immediately frozen, whereas payments deposited into these Gazprombank accounts (located in Russia) would be accessible to Gazprom, which would circumvent these Western sanctions.

The first post-1 April payments were due near the end of April and in May. Putin stated that any country refusing to use the new payment mechanism would be in violation of their contracts and face "corresponding repercussions". The Russian government would consider a failure to pay to be a default and the existing contract would be terminated. The decree allowed exceptions to be made for buyers that would permit them to pay as before.

On 29 April 2022, Germany's Economy Ministry clarified that European energy companies won't be in breach sanctions if they comply with decree 172, saying in an emailed statement that "According to these guidelines, account K, to which payment is made in euros/dollars, is in line with the sanctions if companies declare that contracts have been fulfilled with payment in euros or dollars."

Gas delivery disruption, April 2022 – present
On 26 April 2022, Gazprom announced it would stop delivering natural gas to Poland via the Yamal–Europe pipeline and to Bulgaria from the following day as both countries had failed to make due payments to Gazprom in rubles. Poland said it did not expect to experience disruptions due to its natural gas storage facilities being about 75% full (ensuring 40–180 days of supply), the Poland–Lithuania gas pipeline becoming operational in May 2022, and the Baltic Pipe natural gas pipeline between Poland and Norway becoming operational in October 2022, which would make Poland fully independent of Russian gas. Poland could also import gas via the Świnoujście LNG terminal in the city of Świnoujście in the country's extreme north-west. Meanwhile, Bulgaria was almost completely dependent on Russian gas.

The following day, Gazprom announced that it had "completely suspended gas supplies" to Poland's PGNiG and Bulgaria's Bulgargaz "due to absence of payments in roubles". Bulgaria, Poland, and the European Union condemned the suspension. The announcement of the suspension caused natural gas prices to surge and the Russian ruble to reach a 2 year high against the Euro in Moscow trade.

On 11 May 2022, Ukraine's state-owned gas grid operator GTSOU halted the flow of natural gas through the Sokhranovka transit point, which had transported about one third of all of piped Russian natural gas that transited through Ukraine. It was the first time since the start of Russia's 24 February invasion of Ukraine that natural gas flow through Ukraine was interrupted. 
The Ukrainian government stated that it would not reopen this pipeline unless it regained control of areas from pro-Russian fighters. On the same day, Russia imposed sanctions on European subsidiaries of Gazprom which had been nationalized by European countries.

On 20 May 2022, Gazprom announced that it had informed Finland that the next morning, natural gas deliveries to the country would be halted due to the refusal of the Finnish state-owned gas wholesaler to pay in rubles (that is, to comply with decree 172). Natural gas accounted for 5% of Finland's total annual energy consumption, with the majority of this natural gas being supplied by Russia.

On 14 June 2022, Gazprom announced it would be slashing gas flow via the Nord Stream 1 pipeline, due to what it claimed was Siemens’ failure to return compressor units on time that had been sent off to Canada for repair. The explanation was challenged by Germany's energy regulator.

On 16 June 2022, European benchmark natural gas prices increased by around 30% after Gazprom reduced Nord Stream 1's gas supply to Germany to 40% of the pipeline's capacity. Russia warned that usage of the pipeline could be completely suspended because of problems with the repairment.

On 11 July 2022, Nord Stream I was turned off supposedly for maintenance reasons. The Siemens pipeline turbine was repaired in Canada. Due to sanctions, Canada could not deliver the turbine back to Russia after repair works and instead sent it to Germany, despite the call of Volodymyr Zelenskiy to maintain the sanctions.

On 26 September 2022, the Nord Stream 1 and 2 gas pipelines, which connect Russia and Germany, both ruptured in the Baltic Sea. Nord Stream 1 had been operating at a significantly reduced capacity and Nord Stream 2 was not operating, but it still contained gas. As of 7 October 2022, Swedish investigators said evidence pointed to sabotage.

Analysis 
With European policy-makers deciding in March 2022 to replace Russian fossil fuel imports with other fossil fuels imports and European coal energy production, as well as due to Russia being "a key supplier" of materials used for "clean energy technologies", the reactions to the war were projected in March 2022 to have an overall negative impact on the climate emissions pathway.

However aJuly2022 report from three Germany science academies noted that if Russian natural gas imports were to cease in the next few months, around 25% of Europe's natural gas demand could not be met at peak times for a winter similar to that in 2021 moreover that shortfall is due to a lack of transport infrastructure such as pipeline capacity and LNG terminals and that this supply gap can be closed by 2025 if natural gas consumption falls by 20% across Europe and infrastructure is expanded simultaneously.

Afully open study from Zero Lab, Princeton University published in July2022 and based on the GenX framework concluded that reliance on Russia gas could end by October 2022 under the three core scenarios they investigated which ranged from high coal usage to accelerated renewables deployment.  All three cases would result in falling greenhouse gas emissions, relative to business as usual.

Alternate supplies
In May 2022 small natural gas exporter Peru increased its export of liquified natural gas to Europe, especially to Spain and the United Kingdom in the first five months of 2022, by 74% compared to the same period in 2021. As of September 2022, Norway, the second largest non-EU provider of gas to the EU after Russia for several decades, has been constrained by its pipeline network's structural (maximum) capacities. Prior to the opening of the Baltic Pipe, which became partially operational on 26 September 2022, Norway could only increase the volume of deliveries of natural gas to try to compensate Russia's disrupted supplies by a maximum of 5 bcm to Europe, a far cry from Russia's supplies of 155 bcm of natural gas to the EU in 2021.

On 20 May 2022, Germany and Qatar signed a declaration to deepen their energy partnership. Qatar plans to start supplying LNG to Germany in 2024.

The total and operational capacity of global LNG tanker fleet as of 2021 of about 103 billion cubic meters was already operating at full capacity before the 2022 gas disputes. The UK and EU consume about 550 billion cubic meters of gas per year. Although the UK has 3 LNG terminals for gasification much of the EU has insufficient tankers to meet its needs.

On 15 June 2022, Israel, Egypt and the European Union signed a trilateral natural gas agreement.

On 20 June 2022, Dutch climate and energy minister Rob Jetten announced that the Netherlands would remove all restrictions on the operation of coal-fired power stations until at least 2024 in response to Russia's refusal to export natural gas to the country. Operations were previously limited to less than a third of the total production.

Sanctions 

The European Energy ministers agreed, on 19 December 2022, on a price cap for natural gas at €180 per megawatt-hour.

The objective being to stabilise and avoid major upward fluctuations in gas prices.

See also

References

2022 in economics
2022 in international relations
Events affected by the 2022 Russian invasion of Ukraine
Energy crises
Energy policy
Energy policy of Russia
Price disputes involving Gazprom
Natural gas in Russia
Natural resource conflicts
Russia–European Union relations
Vladimir Putin